Jhulasan is a small village located in district of Mehsana, Kadi Taluka in the state of Gujarat, India.

Demographics 
Jhulasan is an important Railway station between Ahmedabad and Delhi via Mehsana railway route. There are large petroleum wells in this village land area. It has a population of about 5,000. The majority of the residents are farmers.  About 1700 and above people from Jhulasan have migrated to USA and Canada. Other families have migrated to the nearby cities of Kalol,Ahmedabad and Gandhinagar.

American astronaut Sunita Williams(Pandya)' father, Deepakbhai Pandya, a doctor in Boston, migrated to the USA in the early 1960s.

There are other prominent residents of this village including Kanubhai Lalbhai Patel who is mechanical engineer and lives in Canada, Mahavir Shankarlal Patel, mechanical engineer working at NIH, USA, Dineshbhai Mathurbhai Patel, professor of chemistry at science college in Nadiyad, India, Dr. Bhikhabhai Chhanabhai Patel who is prominent doctor in Ahmedabad, India,Dr. Ashokbhai Desai(MBBS,MD,M.CH),Piyushbhai B. Barot who is well known Teacher(Chemistry) and speaker, Vishalbhai K. Panchal who is also teacher, Prof.Vimal P. Prajapati(Physics) and many more.

Background 
Jhulasan is one of the most developed villages in Kadi Taluka, district Mehsana of Gujarat state, in India.  Majority of the population in this village are Patels. Thakor, Prajapati, Raval, Rabari, Gajjars, Suthars, Barots, and Ravals are minorities. About 350 families, mostly patels have migrated to USA and Canada.

Temples 
There are many large temples in this village. The Dola Mata (goddess) temple is the biggest one and worldwide popular. There is a Swaminarayan Temple (Under NarNarayan Dev Gadi), Radha Vallabh Temple (Radhe Redhe), Ramji Mandir, Sat Kaival Ashram, Gogleshvar Mahadev, Nilkantheswar Mahadev Temple (Mahadev Vas) with Shitla Mata and Hanuman Temple, Pipaleshavar Mahadev Temple, Narayan Mahadev Temple, Varahi Mata Temple, Vihat Mata Temple and few other temples.

Education 
Jhulasan Anupam Prathmik Shala(primary school) provides education from 1st to 8th grade and C.P.Gajjar High School provides education from 9th grade to 11th grade. To get a higher education after that, one has to go to the nearby village Pansar or Vadu or the cities of Kalol or Ahmedabad. From 1870 to 1910, Primary School was at Niilkanth Mahadev Temple (Mahadev Vas). The current Jhulasan Prathmik School was built in 1910 by Maharaja Sayajirao since Jhulasan village belonged to Gaikavad Sarkar. In 1965, Maganlal Chimanlal Gajjar (Suthar) built C. P. Gajjar High School in memory of his late brother '''Chimanlal Purushottamdas Gajjar, so the school name is C. P. Gajjar High School.

References

External links 
http://jhulasanpatidarbhojansamiti.com/

http://www.dolomaparivarusa.org/

http://saum.atwebpages.com/imsitemap.html
https://youtube.com/watch?v=c7ppIOla9y8&feature=share

Cities and towns in Mehsana district